"Between the Raindrops" is a song by American alternative rock band Lifehouse, which features British singer, Natasha Bedingfield. The song serves as the lead and only single for their sixth album, Almería. The single was released on September 11, 2012.

Music video
A music video for the song was shot in October 5, together with Natasha Bedingfield. It was released on November 9 via Vevo. As the band leaves a ranch to escape an impending storm, packing their possessions into a truck, lead singer Jason Wade stays behind as he and Bedingfield perform their duet across a valley.  As the storm moves in, two white horses are sent galloping into the rain as Wade lights a flare.  The video ends with the storm clearing and Wade walking down a country road with a guitar.

Weekly charts

References

Lifehouse (band) songs
2012 singles
American rock songs
Natasha Bedingfield songs
Songs written by Jason Wade
Songs written by Jacob Kasher
Songs written by Jude Cole
2012 songs
Geffen Records singles
Songs about loyalty